The 2011 All-Africa Games football tournament was held in Maputo, Mozambique between 4–17 September 2011 as part of the 2011 All-Africa Games and featured both a men's and women's African Games football tournament. The men's tournament featured six (6) teams, the women's eight (8).

Venue

Medal summary

Results

Medal table

References

 
2011
2011 All-Africa Games
All